Jos De Jong (born 27 May 1920) was a Belgian wrestler. He competed in two events at the 1952 Summer Olympics.

References

External links
 

1920 births
Possibly living people
Belgian male sport wrestlers
Olympic wrestlers of Belgium
Wrestlers at the 1952 Summer Olympics
Place of birth missing
20th-century Belgian people